Norman Douglas Wilson (1884–1967) was a Toronto-based transportation engineer who designed the Toronto subway, and created a design of a subway for Winnipeg in the late 1950s.

See also

 Wilson Avenue – a street in Toronto named for him
 Wilson (TTC) - a subway station on the above-mentioned street
 Wilson Heights, Toronto - a neighbourhood near the above-mentioned street
 Wilson Heights (electoral district) - named for the above mention neighbourhood

References

1884 births
1967 deaths
20th-century Canadian engineers
People from Old Toronto